The Sinister Six are a group of  supervillains appearing in American comic books published by Marvel Comics, mainly those featuring Spider-Man. The members are drawn from the character's list of enemies, with the original members forming the team in The Amazing Spider-Man Annual #1 (October 1964). Led by Doctor Octopus (introduced in issue number 3), the team in its premiere followed swiftly the very early appearances of many of the most enduring members of Spider-Man's rogue's gallery: Vulture (the title's first super-villain, in issue #2), Sandman (issue #4), Electro (#9), Mysterio (from #13), and Kraven the Hunter (#15). While Doctor Octopus has generally remained its leader, the Sinister Six has had multiple variations of composition.

The team has been adapted into various forms of media, mainly in animated series and video games. A film based on the team is in development as part of Sony's Spider-Man Universe.

Publication history

The Sinister Six first appeared in The Amazing Spider-Man Annual #1 (January 1964).

Fictional team biography

Original Sinister Six
After suffering two defeats from Spider-Man, Doctor Octopus is separated from his tentacle pack. After his tentacle pack breaks free and helps Doctor Octopus get out of prison, he contacts every known supervillain who had crossed paths with Spider-Man. Only Electro, Kraven the Hunter, the original Mysterio, the Sandman, and the original Vulture respond. As none of the members are willing to relinquish the honor of killing Spider-Man themselves, they decide to challenge Spider-Man individually with the order in which they face him determined by a random drawing. The Sinister Six kidnap Aunt May and Daily Bugle secretary Betty Brant, holding them hostage in order to force Spider-Man to confront them. Spider-Man defeats the Sinister Six members one-by-one, mocking their decision to battle him individually instead of as a team in front of Doctor Octopus, the last one to be defeated.

"The Return of the Sinister Six"
In The Amazing Spider-Man #334–339, Doctor Octopus recruits Electro, Sandman, Mysterio, and Vulture, along with the demonic Hobgoblin (since Kraven the Hunter had recently died), as part of his plan to take over the world. However, this was a trick, part of a larger plan by which Doc Ock alone would be the master of the world, by releasing a chemical into the atmosphere that would cause pain in anyone who attempted to use cocaine; he would then sell his cure for the chemical to the rich and powerful. Sandman, who at this point in his career had reformed and was blackmailed into joining, aids Spider-Man in defeating the Sinister Six, and ultimately stopping Doc Ock's plans to conquer the world. Because Octopus' chemical is eating away the ozone layer, Spider-Man has no choice but to release the cure into the atmosphere.

"Revenge of the Sinister Six"
In Spider-Man #18-23, Electro, Mysterio, Vulture, and Hobgoblin reunite in a bid to take revenge on Doctor Octopus. To trick Sandman into joining them, they hit his foster family with a bomb, leading him to believe Doctor Octopus attacked them as punishment for betraying him. Sandman contacts Spider-Man and asks him to shadow the group as insurance against him being double-crossed. Doctor Octopus easily defeats the other members of the six with his newly reacquired adamantium arms, then zaps Sandman with a weapon that transforms his body into glass and beats Spider-Man nearly to death. When police surround the building, the other members of the Sinister Six agree to serve Doctor Octopus in exchange for his helping them escape. The assembled Sinister Six go off on a rampage, stealing advanced weapons and technology from several sources, including an alien dimension and a facility specializing in cybernetics. To again complete their quorum of six, they recruit Gog. Eventually, Spider-Man and several other heroes (including the Ghost Rider, Deathlok, Nova, the Hulk, and Solo) confront the villains as they are seizing a HYDRA base to gain access to deadly, world-devastating weapons. Most of the members are again incarcerated, but Vulture and Hobgoblin escape.

Sinister Seven
A variation known as the Sinister Seven is formed by Hobgoblin to fight Kaine after he killed Doctor Octopus and the Grim Hunter (Kraven's son Vladimir). Hobgoblin's Sinister Seven includes the Beetle, Electro, Mysterio, Scorpia, the Shocker, and the Vulture. They finally find Kaine and a battle erupts. Spider-Man saves Kaine from being executed; the two then work together and defeat the Sinister Seven.

Sandman's Sinister Six
Eventually, the Sandman (who had been turned back into a villain by his former ally the Wizard) and the second Mysterio (the original had committed suicide following his fight with Daredevil) form a new version of the Sinister Six, with Venom temporarily replacing Doctor Octopus and the other members consisting of Electro, the second Kraven the Hunter (another son of the dead original), and the Vulture. Sandman uses the Sinister Six in order to get revenge on Doctor Octopus for turning him into glass in "The Return of the Sinister Six" storyline. The Sinister Six are defeated again, and Venom subsequently attacks the various members of the group after being betrayed by them. He nearly kills the Sandman and badly injures Electro and Kraven the Hunter before he and his symbiote are briefly separated from each other by the mysterious Senator Ward.

Sinister Twelve

In Marvel Knights Spider-Man, Norman Osborn is unmasked to the public as the Green Goblin and imprisoned. Osborn contacts a group of supervillains who also bear grudges against Spider-Man, all of whom had been financed by Osborn's fortunes for years. Eager to retaliate, the villains agree to band together, and the Sinister Twelve is formed.

Mac Gargan is the de facto leader of the Twelve while Osborn is in prison, and he kidnaps Peter Parker's Aunt May and threatens to kill her if Spider-Man does not help Osborn escape from jail. Spider-Man, with help from Black Cat, breaks Osborn out only to be confronted by the Vulture, the Sandman, Electro, the Chameleon, the Lizard, Hydro-Man, the Shocker, Hammerhead, Boomerang and Tombstone. Osborn, now in the guise of the Goblin, introduces them as the Sinister Twelve.

Spider-Man and Black Cat are rescued by Captain America, Iron Man, Daredevil, Yellowjacket and the Fantastic Four. Furious, Goblin rockets away and kidnaps Mary Jane Watson and Spider-Man pursues him. Spider-Man and the Goblin clash upon a bridge (not the one where Gwen Stacy was killed). Finally, Osborn gives a vital clue as to Aunt May's whereabouts before being knocked into the river below. In the aftermath, Aunt May is found and saved. The rest of the Sinister Twelve are subdued by the other heroes and arrested.

Civil War's Sinister Six
A new version of the Sinister Six apparently bands together during the Civil War storyline. The line-up consists of Doctor Octopus, Grim Reaper, Lizard, Shocker, Trapster and Vulture. They are stopped by Captain America and his Secret Avengers off-panel and discovered bound and subdued by S.H.I.E.L.D.

"Big Time" Sinister Six
Following the events of the "Origin of the Species" storyline which involves Doctor Octopus assembling Spider-Man's enemies into targeting Harry Osborn's baby (who Doctor Octopus thought had some of Norman Osborn's DNA), only the Chameleon, Electro, Mysterio, the Rhino, and the Sandman remain with Doctor Octopus to reform the Sinister Six when the baby does not inherit Norman Osborn's DNA. Their first plot involves sending Micro-Octobots to blow up an Air Force base. This is prevented by Spider-Man, the Avengers, and the Fantastic Four.

Spider-Man and the Future Foundation stumble on a plot on a Caribbean Island by the Sinister Six which involves the use of a zombie pirate crew. During the fight with the Sinister Six, Spider-Man realizes that the Doctor Octopus, Electro, Rhino and Sandman that they are fighting are robots, while Mysterio and the Chameleon are the only real ones present. Meanwhile, the real Doctor Octopus infiltrates the Baxter Building to look for specific technology plans.

While the adult Avengers are dealing with the eruption of Mount Etna, Tigra and the Avengers Academy students learn that Electro has broken into a French laboratory. Once on the scene, the students discover that Electro is accompanied by the rest of the Sinister Six. The Sinister Six overpower the students and Doctor Octopus steals a device containing self-sustaining power. Doctor Octopus and the Sinister Six later fight the Intelligencia where the Chameleon had infiltrated the group disguised as Klaw. After the Intelligencia members are defeated, the Sinister Six steal their Zero Cannon (a weapon which changes Earth's gravity field to send specific objects into space). Doctor Octopus later appears in a robot suit which would help to keep him alive.

Doctor Octopus and Mysterio coordinate the Octobots that have infiltrated the Apogee 1 Space Station and taken over some of the crew members. When Mysterio notices that some of the Octobots were disabled, Doctor Octopus orders the Octobots to finish their mission and then destroy the space station. When Spider-Man arrives on the Apogee 1 Space Station, Doctor Octopus pushes a button that starts to move the Apogee 1 Space Station close to Earth. After Apogee 1 Space Station is destroyed and the crew is evacuated by Spider-Man, the Human Torch and John Jameson, Doctor Octopus tells the rest of the Sinister Six that his master plan is about to begin.

Ends of the Earth
In the "Ends of the Earth" storyline, all of Doctor Octopus' preparations come to fruition in a plan to conquer the world. Doctor Octopus activates a giant antenna array called the Octahedral which, in turn, activates Earth-orbiting satellites he calls the Octavian Lens. The Lens works to speed up the greenhouse effect, which in turn heats up the Earth. Upon hacking into televisions around the world, Doctor Octopus describes what his satellites are doing, and shuts them down. He says he can save the world "at a price". At Palazzo Senatorio, an international gathering of world leaders and the planet's greatest minds meet to discuss Doctor Octopus's supposed offer to save the world. The Avengers crash the assembly and Spider-Man captures the Chameleon, who is at the meeting disguised as Vice President Al Gore. Spider-Man lets the Chameleon go, but he secretly places a Spider-Tracer on him, which allows Spider-Man and the Avengers to follow the Chameleon to the Mediterranean Coast where the rest of the Sinister Six is waiting. The Six subdue the Avengers, leaving only Spider-Man standing. Spider-Man is taken down when trying to gain control of Doctor Octopus's tentacles with his helmet.

The Sinister Six then leave the area, and Doctor Octopus issues his demands: control of 200 missile facilities (for use in his plan), as well as 2 billion dollars for each of the members of the Sinister Six. In response, Spider-Man contacts Horizon Labs for help. Doctor Octopus sends the Sandman to guard one of the missile facilities in the Sahara Desert. After Spider-Man, the Black Widow, and Silver Sable enter the facility and defeat the Sandman, Doctor Octopus contacts the U.N. once again and orders them to kill Spider-Man in retaliation. In a subsequent missile facility raid, Spider-Man and his allies manage to defeat the Rhino, but they are unable to capture him because they are attacked by S.H.I.E.L.D (under orders from the U.N., via Doctor Octopus's demands). Forced to flee, Spider-Man and his allies then attempt to rally support from Earth's other heroes after the Titanium Man alerts them to the fact that Doctor Octopus has been recruiting other villains. Tracking down a final facility, Spider-Man learns that Doctor Octopus has already launched all of his satellites. However, this is revealed to be a deception created by Mysterio and the Chameleon. Spider-Man defeats the Chameleon when he attempts to attack them in a "Doc-Ock" suit of armor. Spider-Man and his allies then convince Mysterio to help them track down Doctor Octopus's base. While they find the base, they also find themselves pitted against the 'new' Sinister Six—in the form of the mind-controlled Avengers.

Despite Doctor Octopus's confidence, the heroes prevail against their mind-controlled teammates; the Black Widow and Hawkeye are knocked out by Iron Man while he is still under Doctor Octopus's control. Spider-Man's new training, combined with Captain America subconsciously holding back, allows Spider-Man and Silver Sable to defeat Spider-Woman and Captain America, respectively. Finally, Mysterio uses an EMP generator to negate the Octobots controlling Thor, Iron Man and the Red Hulk. Now "Octobot" free, these remaining three Avengers set out to take out Doctor Octopus's missiles, while Spider-Man and Silver Sable confront Doctor Octopus in his base. The two are first met by the Rhino, who decides to drown himself and take Sable with him in an attempt to psychologically beat Spider-Man into submission, but Spider-Man musters his strength, manages to destroy Doctor Octopus's arms and equipment and ultimately hauls his foe away to a doctor.

Marvel NOW!'s Sinister Six
As part of the Marvel NOW! event, the Superior Spider-Man (Doctor Octopus's mind in Peter Parker's body) encounters a new Sinister Six consisting of Boomerang, Overdrive, the Shocker, the Speed Demon, the Living Brain and the female Beetle that previously fought Captain America and the Black Widow. The group of villains attacks Horizon Labs, but the Superior Spider-Man defeats them, using a power-dampening field to disable their equipment. He is preparing to kill Boomerang when the still-living consciousness of Peter Parker stops him. Otto gives the villains to the NYPD and EMTs upon their arrival.

This version of the Sinister Six (minus the Living Brain) appears in its own series Superior Foes of Spider-Man. The Sinister Six later assaulted the Owl's base. Overdrive and the Speed Demon were captured by the Owl and interrogated. The Beetle tried to blackmail the Owl into releasing them, while covertly dialing for back-up. Unimpressed, the Owl got ready to execute her when reinforcements arrived in the form of Tombstone (who was revealed to be the Beetle's father). At one point to steal valuables from the Chameleon, including a portrait of Doctor Doom, the Sinister Six allied with the Owl, where they expand the group into a "Sinister Sixteen". Besides Boomerang, the Beetle, Overdrive, the Owl, and the Speed Demon, the group consists of the Armadillo, the Bi-Beast, the Clown, the Cyclone, the Human Fly, the Kangaroo, Man Mountain Marko, Mirage, Scorcher, Shriek, the Spot and the Squid. The team eventually broke up after Boomerang had thoroughly screwed everyone over, including himself.

Superior Six
Following the deletion of Peter Parker's memories and acquiring the Raft as his new base which he renamed Spider-Island II, the Superior Spider-Man begins to collect former Sinister Six members and store them in his underwater lab with the implied intention to create a new team as the Superior Spider-Man. First, he acquired the sand grain that contained the Sandman's consciousness. When Electro returned to Earth after being hurled into space by Thor, the Superior Spider-Man enlisted Thor to help defeat Electro. The Superior Spider-Man then confiscated the Chameleon from S.H.I.E.L.D. custody. The Superior Spider-Man came across Mysterion (a villain that is dressed like Mysterio) robbing the bank. Upon defeating Mysterion, the Superior Spider-Man discovered that the villain he thought was Mysterio was not Quentin Beck, but an unnamed man who bought the Mysterio gear from the Hobgoblin. Finally, the Superior Spider-Man went up against the Vulture, who seeks to get even with the Superior Spider-Man for beating him up twice. The Superior Spider-Man managed to defeat the Vulture.

The Superior Spider-Man debuts with mind-controlled members as the supposedly-reformed "Superior Six" at the time when Lightmaster invades Alchemax to obtain an invention that would work in sync with his own light powers. The Superior Six ended up fighting the Wrecking Crew (who were hired by Lightmaster to assist him). Due to the second Sun Girl's widespread attack, the Superior Spider-Man lost control of the Superior Six and they attacked him. The Superior Spider-Man and Sun Girl had to team up to defeat them.

Sinister Sixty-Six
Mojo and the Chameleon abduct Spider-Man and his X-Men students and force them to star in a show which pits them against the Sinister Sixty-Six. The group, which is not seen in its entirety, consists of holographic stand-ins of various enemies of Spider-Man like the Beetle, Carnage, the Demogoblin, Doctor Octopus, the Duster, Electro, the Gibbon, the Green Goblin, the Grizzly, Hammerhead, the Hobgoblin, the Jackal, Jack O'Lantern, the Kingpin, Kraven the Hunter, the Lizard, Morbius the Living Vampire, Mysterio, the Puma, the Rhino, the Ringer, the Sandman, the Scorpion, the Shocker, Shriek, Tombstone, Vermin and the Vulture.

Swarm's Sinister Six
Spider-Man and the students of the Jean Grey School for Higher Learning encounter the eighth incarnation of the Sinister Six led by Swarm and consisting of the third 8-Ball, Delilah, Killer Shrike, the third Melter and the Squid. After Hellion defeated Swarm, the other members of the Sinister Six surrendered.

Iron Spider's Sinister Six
Purchasing a recolored and modified version of the Iron Spider armor, Miles Morales' uncle Aaron Davis forms his incarnation of the Sinister Six consisting of Bombshell, the Francine Frye version of Electro, the Roderick Kingsley version of the Hobgoblin, Sandman, and Spot. Their first mission was to steal a decommissioned S.H.I.E.L.D. Helicarrier.

Sinister Sixty
Spider-Man plays with a cancer patient named Nathan, where they envision that Nathan becomes Spider-Bite and they "fight" Stilt-Man's Sinister Sixty who wish to obtain Spider-Bite's action figure of Spider-Man. The line-up consists of Absorbing Man, Big Man, Black Cat, Black Tarantula, Boomerang, Calypso, Carrion, Carnage, Chameleon, Demogoblin, Doctor Octopus, Doppelganger, Electro, the Enforcers, Fusion, Green Goblin, Grey Goblin, Hammerhead, Hobgoblin, Hydro-Man, Jack O'Lantern, Jackal, Joystick, Juggernaut, Kaine, Kingpin, Kraven the Hunter, Kraven the Hunter II, Kraven the Hunter III, Lady Octopus, Lizard, Mephisto, Mister Negative, Molten Man, Morbius, the Living Vampire, Morlun, Mysterio, Raptor, Rhino, Sandman, Sasha Kravinoff, Scorpia, Scorpion, Scream, Screwball, Shocker, Shriek, Silvermane, Sin-Eater, Alistair Smythe, Stunner, Swarm, Tarantula, Venom, Vermin, and Vulture. Spider-Man and Spider-Bite defeat the Sinister Sixty at Grand Central Station and keep Stilt-Man from claiming the Spider-Man action figure.

Sinister War
While Doctor Octopus is discovering clues to some of his missing memories, he exhumes an unexpectedly empty casket in a cemetery. Kindred sends one of his centipedes to enter Doctor Octopus' ear, rendering him unconscious.

In a lead-up to "Sinister War", Kindred tells Doctor Octopus that he can help him with his memories, but he will need to gather five more people. At an unknown beach, Doctor Octopus helps Sandman with his loss of direction and promises to solve Sandman's immortality problem. Upon building a special machine, Doctor Octopus resurrects Electro with his powers intact as Kindred comments on Electro's abilities while stating that Doctor Octopus is getting closer to his true self. Doctor Octopus and Electro find Kraven the Hunter in the Savage Land hunting a dinosaur. Electro shocks the dinosaur, and Doctor Octopus recruits Kraven the Hunter into the Sinister Six by promising him to hunt down the Lizard. Doctor Octopus coerces Curt Connors into using the Isotope Genome Accelerator on himself which separates him from his Lizard side. Kindred then completes the Sinister Six by having Mysterio join him as Kindred notes that his endgame with Spider-Man is approaching.

When the Savage Six attacks the world premiere of a movie that Mary Jane Watson and a disguised Mysterio were involved in, the Sinister Six intervenes in order to get Mysterio in their ranks despite Spider-Man's intervention. Mysterio complies with Doctor Octopus and teleports Mary Jane away while Doctor Octopus knocks out Spider-Man. Kindred kept the Savage Six on the reserve should Foreigner's group, the Superior Foes, and the Sinister Syndicate fail to eliminate Spider-Man. Badly wounded, Peter is relieved to find the Black Cat, Wolverine, and Human Torch have arrived to help, unaware they are Mysterio, Lizard, and Electro in illusion disguises created by the former. Lizard springs their trap too early by attacking Peter, much to Mysterio's annoyance. Peter fends off the Sinister Six until Doctor Octopus snares him with his tentacles. Peter attempts to appeal to Doctor Octopus' better nature, telling him he is not like this anymore. Doctor Octopus briefly hesitates, but mounting pressure from the rest of the Sinister Six compels him to act though this buys Peter enough time to break free. The Savage Six then attack the Sinister Six, giving Peter time to escape.

Membership

Other versions

Age of Apocalypse
In the Age of Apocalypse 10th anniversary limited series, Mister Sinister assembles his own group dubbed the Sinister Six. However, this group is unrelated to the more established lineup of criminals. It includes Cloak and Dagger, Sonique, Sauron, Blob and Phoenix.

Avataars: Covenant of the Shield
On the planet Earth created by the Shaper of Worlds, the Sinister Six are known as the Six Most Sinister, a group of criminals operating a tollbooth in the Webwood who are led by the Goblin King and consist of Huntsman, Jolt, Mysterium, Sandstorm, Talon, and Tentaclus. When the Champions of the Realm attempt to pass through the Webwoods, they are attacked by the Six Most Sinister, who they easily deal with and leave defeated as they move on.

Marvel 1602
The Sinister Sextet of Earth-311 is formed by the universe's version of Carnage with Electro, Hobgoblin, Karnov (Earth-311's version of Kraven the Hunter), Magus (Earth-311's version of Mysterio), and Serpent (who is similar to Lizard) as its members. The dimension hopping Web-Warriors who aides dimensions who lost its Spider-Man defeated Sinister Sextet and as they round up their captives they notice that Electro escaped, unbeknown to the group, followed them to the Great Web.

Marvel 2099
An unidentified reality's version of Marvel 2099 was created after Miguel time-traveled into the past. There, he encountered its version of the Sinister Six including Venom (Kron Stone), the Goblin, Doctor Octopus (an Atlantean with octopus tentacles coming out of his back), Vulture, Electro (an android that gained sentience following a lightning strike), and Sandwoman (whose sand causes nightmares). The Sinister Six capture Miguel when he is returned to his time, but he manages to escape with the aid of his brother Gabriel who generates an illusion of a demon to distract them. After the Sinister Six caught the Goblin who secretly was helping Gabriel, Miguel saves Goblin (Father Jennifer) and escapes back into present time. As the portal opened, Doctor Octopus 2099 kills Goblin and escapes. Now that the Sinister Six is no more, Venture enters and joins the team where he plans to recruit them to Fist.

Marvel Zombies
A zombified version of the Sinister Six appears in Marvel Zombies: Dead Days. They are seen attacking innocent civilians upon the S.H.I.E.L.D. helicarrier, but are repelled by Wolverine and Magneto. These infected members each include Doctor Octopus, Green Goblin, Vulture, Sandman, Electro and Mysterio.

Marvel Zombies Return
In the Marvel Zombies series, the Sinister Six appear in an alternative universe that Zombie Spider-Man enters, working for the Kingpin and consisting of Doctor Octopus, Sandman, Vulture, Mysterio, Electro and Kraven the Hunter. They are quickly and violently ripped apart, bitten and zombified (except Sandman who hopefully flees by turning into sand and disguising himself as the dirt Zombie Spider-Man stood on), and end up eating Spider-Man's friends, which causes them to be killed in retaliation. The only uninfected person who could help the zombie Spider-Man avenge Aunt May and Mary Jane is Sandman. Upon him leaving and dead, Zombie Spider-Man thanked Sandman, to which Sandman replies "Good riddance, ya disgusting freak". Later, Sandman was congratulated by Uatu the Watcher for the wipeout help

Secret Wars (2015)
Two versions of the Sinister Six appears in the Secret Wars storyline where they each reside in their part of Battleworld:

 In the tie-in issues of Spider-Verse, the Sinister Six featured in that mini-series reside in the Battleworld domain of Arachnia. This team consists of Doctor Octopus, Kraven the Hunter, Scorpion, Mysterio, Shocker, and Vulture. Mayor Norman Osborn sent the Sinister Six to apprehend Spider-Gwen, Spider-UK, Spider-Man Noir, Spider-Girl, Spider-Man India, and Spider-Ham. During Spider-Gwen's infiltration of Oscorp, she found a list that labels her and the others as the Sinister Six.
 In Amazing Spider-Man: Renew Your Vows, the Sinister Six works under the Regency's leader Regent who captures all those with natural powers to enhance his own, leaving the Sinister Six out as they are all technology-based villains. The team consists of Doctor Octopus, Kraven the Hunter, Hobgoblin, Mysterio, Shocker, and Vulture. Regent orders them to capture the resurfaced Spider-Man after years of hiding. However, with Spider-Man now fighting to protect his child rather than himself, he kills Doctor Octopus in their first rematch while Hobgoblin was caught in an explosion and Vulture was incapacitated. Regent later recruited Beetle, Boomerang, and Rhino to fill in the membership gaps. The rest of the Six end up being defeated when the remaining Avengers emerge to help Spider-Man protect his daughter and Power Pack.

Spider's Shadow Sinister Six
In the miniseries Spider-Man: Spider's Shadow where the symbiote is able to more fully bond with Peter, Spider-Man's darker actions under the influence of the symbiote prompt Jameson to form a new Sinister Six in the form of Doctor Octopus, Rhino, Electro, Mysterio, Kraven and Jameson himself using a Spider-Slayer, after, the wall-crawler kills Hobgoblin, Shocker and Scorpion and assaults Jameson and the Kingpin. Eddie Brock attempts to join the group by killing Octavius and taking the tentacles for himself, but the symbiote Spider-Man still manages to kill Rhino, Electro and Mysterio and seriously injure Brock before a burning building near the battle site drives the symbiote off Peter, forcing Jameson to acknowledge that he's wrong about the wall-crawler and saves his life while Kraven retreats.

Spider-Man: Reign
An older version of the Sinister Six, dubbed the "Sinner Six" appeared in Spider-Man: Reign. This version of the team (composed of Scorpion, Electro, Mysterio, Kraven the Hunter, Sandman, and Hydro-Man) are forced into the employ of New York's fascist mayor Mayor Waters via microchips placed inside them that would detonate if they attempted to leave the city. If they succeeded in killing Spider-Man, they would be given their freedom.

Scorpion was tossed out a window and presumably killed by Spider-Man. Electro and Hydro-Man were killed when Spider-Man caused the two to fall onto each other. Spider-Man defeated both Kraven and Mysterio and left them webbed up.

After his long-lost daughter was killed by the Reign (policemen under Waters' control), Sandman confronts Waters who gives him the detonator. As Spider-Man is battling a series of Venom symbiotes, Sandman gives him the detonator before allowing himself to be devoured by the symbiotes. Spider-Man presses the detonator, causing the rest of the Six to presumably explode.

Spider-Man magazine
In the Spider-Man Adventures magazine, a version of the Sinister Six appears, formed by Doctor Doom. It consisted of Doctor Octopus, Vulture, Electro, Rhino, Sandman, and Venom (Eddie Brock). They appear in a multi-part storyline with Spider-Man fighting each member in a different time period. In the final part, the Sinister Six and Doctor Doom fight Spider-Man and the Fantastic Four. All are defeated, though Vulture went into the Baxter Building and tried to steal some gold statues only to be pummeled by the heroes.

Spider-Verse
During the Spider-Verse storyline, a version of the Sinister Six called the Six Men of Sinestry resides on Earth-803 where it is set in Industrial Age New York in 1895. The team is led by the Green Goblin and composed of Doctor Octopus, Electro, Kraven the Hunter, Mysterio, and Vulture. Their objective was to steal the Mayor's plans. They battled Lady Spider and were forced to retreat after they were overwhelmed, yet they were able to accomplish their task. The Six Men of Sinestry appeared once more attacking Lady Spider and Spider-Man 2099 when they were fixing up Leopardon, but end up beaten by the two spiders (with Lady Spider exclaiming in passing that Sinestry is not a real word). Spider-Man 2099 would later exclaim that their technology was first class despite the era's limitations.

Swinester Six
In the Spider-Ham 25th Anniversary Special, Peter Porker, a.k.a. Spider-Ham faces the Swinester Six. The group consists of Green Gobbler, Doctor Octopuss, Sandmanatee, Eelectro, Buzzard and Mysteriape.

Ultimate Marvel
The Sinister Six's Ultimate Marvel version was an Ultimate Six consisting of Sandman, Doctor Octopus, Kraven the Hunter, Electro and the Green Goblin. The group went up against Nick Fury and the Ultimates after the villains escaped a S.H.I.E.L.D. prison they were held in after each had been defeated by Spider-Man and arrested by S.H.I.E.L.D. for illegally altering their own genetic codes. Spider-Man temporarily became the sixth member as he believed that Aunt May had been kidnapped. When Spider-Man is informed by Captain America that his aunt was safe in S.H.I.E.L.D custody, Spider-Man turned on the Ultimate Six and helped the Ultimates defeat the Ultimate Six where Iron Man defeats Sandman, Wasp defeats Doctor Octopus, and Thor defeats Electro and Kraven as the Ultimates help Spider-Man defeat Green Goblin.

In Ultimate X-Men Annual #1, the X-Men fought simulations of the five in the Danger Room.

The Ultimate Six return in "The Death of Spider-Man" storyline. It is revealed that Norman Osborn did not die as originally thought, but had survived. The Goblin transforms and escapes at the first chance, breaking out fellow prisoners Doctor Octopus, Sandman, Electro, and Kraven the Hunter with Vulture as a new addition to the team. The Six steal a helicopter which Electro pilots and escape before taking refuge in someone's apartment. It is their luck that they have escaped at the same time the Ultimates fight the New Avengers as there will be no one to stop them from attacking Spider-Man. However, Doctor Octopus does not want to kill Spider-Man stating that he and Osborn were responsible for Spider-Man's creation. Osborn retaliates by turning into the Goblin and killing Doctor Octopus in the resulting fight. The remaining five villains make their way to Elijah Stern's lair where Vulture's suit is upgraded and Kraven gets a set of blasters and knives. The five go to Peter Parker's house in Queens and confront Johnny Storm and Bobby Drake. Johnny defeats Osborn with a powerful blast but is quickly defeated by Sandman while Bobby is defeated by Electro. Peter arrives on the scene and dispatches Vulture and quickly defeats the other three with ease. Sandman gets back up and assists Vulture into knocking down Peter. Electro regains consciousness and is prepared to deal the final blow. Aunt May suddenly arrives on the scene, shooting Electro multiple times. This causes Electro to unleash a huge amount of electricity which renders Kraven, Sandman, and Vulture unconscious. As May and Peter embrace, the Goblin gets back on his feet and prepares to attack. After a brutal battle through Queens, Peter finally kills the Goblin with a flaming van as he is caught in its explosion. Culminated with a bullet wound upon protecting Captain America from Punisher during the fight earlier, Peter dies in his aunt's arms as Osborn seemingly dies with a smile in victory.

In other media

Television
 A variation of the Sinister Six called the Insidious Six appear in Spider-Man (1994). Formed in their self-titled episode and the episode "Battle of the Insidious Six", the Kingpin assembles Doctor Octopus, Mysterio, Shocker, Chameleon, Rhino, and Scorpion to help him settle a debt with his enemy Silvermane. When the group realize the connection between Peter Parker photographing Spider-Man, the Insidious Six overpower and unmask him due to the hero's temporary loss of powers at the time, only to assume Parker came to fight them himself because he could not find the real Spider-Man. Later on, Spider-Man is able to strategically defeat them when his powers partially return. The Insidious Six return in the five-part episode "Six Forgotten Warriors", with Vulture replacing Mysterio, who died in a previous episode. They attempt to help the Kingpin unlock a doomsday machine, but the Chameleon betrays the group to help his foster father, the Red Skull. After the team is defeated again, it is disbanded for good and its members return to their own lives.
 The Sinister Six appear in The Spectacular Spider-Man. Introduced in the episode "Group Therapy", Doctor Octopus, Sandman, Shocker, Vulture, Rhino, and Electro pool their resources together and organize a jail break via Hammerhead, then go after Spider-Man, though they are defeated by his symbiote suit. In the episode "Reinforcement", Doc Ock assumes the Master Planner alias and arranges for the Sinister Six's reformation, now with Kraven the Hunter and Mysterio replacing Shocker while Doc Ock himself oversees their work from the shadows. The Sinister Six are again defeated by Spider-Man, though only Mysterio is arrested as the others escaped before the police arrived. In the episode "Shear Strength", the remaining members help Doc Ock with his plan to take over the world by hacking into the FBI's servers, but Spider-Man thwarts them and captures Electro. After capturing Rhino in the episode "Accomplices", Spider-Man later defeats and captures Vulture and Doc Ock in the episode "Gangland".
 The Sinister Six appear in Ultimate Spider-Man. Introduced in their self-titled episode, Doctor Octopus, Electro, Kraven the Hunter, Rhino, Beetle, and a mind-controlled Lizard attack Spider-Man. While he defeats them with help from his fellow S.H.I.E.L.D. trainees, the Lizard escapes while the others are arrested. In the episode "Return of the Sinister Six", Doc Ock reforms the team with Scorpion replacing Beetle and provides them all with high-tech armor made from stolen Oscorp technology, but they are defeated by Spider-Man and his team again, with help from Iron Patriot. Doc Ock spends the fourth season, Ultimate Spider-Man vs. the Sinister Six, secretly forming a Sinister Seven with help from HYDRA. While Spider-Man and the Web Warriors defeat and capture supervillains to thin out Doc Ock's potential candidates, the villain goes on to recruit Kraven, Electro, a demonic Green Goblin from another universe, Hydro-Man, and a mind-controlled Rhino; with Scarlet Spider serving as a mole within Spider-Man's team. The Sinister Seven is defeated by Spider-Man and his allies in the two-part episode "The New Sinister Six" after Scarlet Spider defects to the heroes' side, though Doc Ock escapes. In the two-part series finale, "Graduation Day", Doc Ock forms the Superior Sinister Six with Kraven, Scorpion, and a mind-controlled Vulture, Rhino, and Crossbones mutated into a new Lizard to eliminate Spider-Man after learning his secret identity. Spider-Man defeats them once more, freeing the brainwashed villains from Doc Ock's control before persuading him to surrender.
 The Sinister Six appears in Spider-Man (2017). Introduced in the episode "The Rise of Doc Ock" Pt. 4, they were originally the Osborn Commandos, a fighting force brought together by Norman Osborn and consisting of Doctor Octopus, Vulture, Rhino, Alistair Smythe, and Steel Spider. However, Doc Ock goes rogue and places the team under mind control, re-branding the team as the Sinister Five. In the episode "Hobgoblin" Pt. 1, Doc Ock also places Spider-Man under mind control and has him join the team to make it the Sinister Six. However, Harry Osborn becomes the Hobgoblin and frees Spider-Man and the rest of the team from Doc Ock's control. All of the group's members are defeated and arrested by the end of season one.

Film

Amazing Spider-Man series
In December 2013, Sony announced two spin-offs of The Amazing Spider-Man franchise, The Sinister Six and Venom, with Drew Goddard attached to write and direct the former. Throughout the live-action film The Amazing Spider-Man 2, a line-up for the team was teased. During the end credits, weapons and technology belonging to Rhino, Vulture, Doctor Octopus, Mysterio, and Kraven the Hunter were revealed, confirming them as members, with the Green Goblin serving as the leader. However, this line-up is left to be debated as Goddard stated he wanted to adopt a more classic adaptation of the group which would have included Sandman and Doc Ock as the leader. The film was said to be a redemption story for the characters, and would probably not feature Spider-Man. As the Sinister Six's original goal, however, was to kill him, there would seem to be a chance that he would appear. The film was originally scheduled for release on November 11, 2016. However, following the announcement in February 2015 of a new Spider-Man franchise with Marvel Studios, the spin-offs were postponed and eventually canceled.

Marvel Cinematic Universe

In an email from Amy Pascal leaked during the Sony Pictures hack, Pascal revealed that she planned for Tom Holland's Spider-Man to appear in a Sinister Six film set in the Marvel Cinematic Universe dependent on the success of the then-upcoming licensing agreement with Marvel Studios.

Sony's Spider-Man Universe

Following the collaboration between Marvel Studios and Sony Pictures, many spin-offs that had been in development before were revived, with the first of these, the live-action film Venom, being released on October 5, 2018. Sony's December 2013 plans for their own expanded universe included a film based on the Sinister Six, with Drew Goddard attached to write and potentially direct. Goddard was confirmed to be directing the film in April 2014. The film was believed to have been canceled by November 2015 when Sony was focusing on its new reboot with Marvel. In October 2018, Goddard acknowledged that his script could eventually be used for a film. By December of the same year, producer Amy Pascal confirmed that the studio intends to use the script in an upcoming project and expressed the company's desire for the filmmaker to direct the film as well.

In the post-credits scene of Morbius (2022), Adrian Toomes from the MCU approaches Dr. Michael Morbius, in an effort to form a team. The team is intended to be the Sinister Six, with director Daniel Espinosa expressing interest in having Norman Osborn be part of the group.

Video games
 The Sinister Six appear in Spider-Man: Return of the Sinister Six, consisting of Doctor Octopus, Electro, Sandman, Mysterio, the Vulture, and the Hobgoblin.
 The Sinister Six appear in Spider-Man 2: The Sinister Six, consisting of Doctor Octopus, Mysterio, Sandman, the Vulture, the Scorpion, and Kraven the Hunter.
 The Sinister Six appear in the interactive DOS game Spider-Man: The Sinister Six, consisting of Doctor Octopus, the Chameleon, Mysterio, the Hobgoblin, the Vulture, and Shocker.
 A multiversal Sinister Six appear in Spider-Man Unlimited, consisting of several multiversal versions of the Green Goblin, the Vulture, Electro, Sandman, Doctor Octopus, and Mysterio. They came together to invade multiple dimensions and harvest iso-8 crystals, with an army of "Sinister Soldiers" aiding them in their conquest.
 The Sinister Six appear in Marvel: Avengers Alliance, consisting of Doctor Octopus, the Vulture, Mysterio, Kraven the Hunter, the Lizard, and Electro. They aim to capture a Spider-Man, many of whom have been gathering because of the threat of Karn of the Inheritors, and sacrifice them to Doctor Octopus' machine to hide their dimension from the threat of incursions.
 The Sinister Six appear in Marvel: Contest of Champions, consisting of Doctor Octopus, the Green Goblin, Venom, Electro, the Vulture, and the Rhino. They are hired by the Grandmaster to eliminate Spider-powered champions. The team re-appear in a promotional video, with Mysterio replacing Venom.
 The Sinister Six appear in Marvel: Future Fight, consisting of Mysterio disguised as Doctor Octopus, the Vulture, the Rhino, Kraven the Hunter, Sandman, and the Lizard. They collaborate with A.I.M., but are eventually defeated by Spider-Man and his allies.
 The Sinister Six appear in Marvel Strike Force, consisting of Doctor Octopus, the Green Goblin, the Rhino, Mysterio, Shocker, and the Vulture. Additionally, Electro and Swarm appear as optional members.
 The Sinister Six appear in Marvel's Spider-Man, consisting of Doctor Octopus, Electro, the Rhino, the Scorpion, the Vulture, and Mister Negative. Everyone but Doc Ock were originally imprisoned at the Raft before the latter released and recruited them in an attempt to exact revenge on his former business partner turned mayor, Norman Osborn. While he shares this goal with Mister Negative, he promises the others their greatest desires in exchange for their assistance. The group clashes with Spider-Man when he interferes, though they easily defeat him during their first fight. Following this, the Sinister Six split up to attack different Oscorp properties while Doctor Octopus secures the Devil's Breath virus and releases it in Times Square, infecting numerous people and causing Manhattan to descend into chaos. After capturing the Vulture, Electro, the Rhino, and the Scorpion, Spider-Man defeats Mister Negative before he can steal the cure, but Doctor Octopus escapes with it and Norman. Spider-Man is eventually able to save Norman, reclaim the cure, and defeat Doctor Octopus. By the end of the game, the Sinister Six are re-arrested and re-imprisoned, but succeeded in exacting revenge on Norman, who resigned from the mayor's office out of shame.
 The Sinister Six appear in Marvel Ultimate Alliance 3: The Black Order, consisting of the Green Goblin, Doctor Octopus, Sandman, Mysterio, Electro, and Venom. The Goblin freed the other members from the Raft after obtaining the Time Stone and they took over the prison. After a team of heroes, including Spider-Man, arrive at the prison to secure the inmates, Venom defects to the heroes' side at Spider-Man's behest while the remaining Sinister Six members are defeated and imprisoned once more.

Miscellaneous 
 The Sinister Six appear in Adam-Troy Castro's trilogy of Spider-Man novels, consisting of Doctor Octopus, the Vulture, Electro, Mysterio, the Chameleon, and an original character called Pity. This version of the group is formed by the Gentleman, who wishes to kill Peter Parker as revenge for the actions of his parents, Richard and Mary Parker, in the 1960s.
 The Sinister Six appear in Spider-Man: Turn Off the Dark, consisting of Electro, Carnage, Swarm, Kraven the Hunter, the Lizard, and an original character called Swiss Miss. This version of the group were all originally research scientists who were created by the Green Goblin as punishment for abandoning Osborn Industries and to destroy Spider-Man.
 The Sinister Six appear in Marvel Universe Live!, consisting of the Green Goblin, Doctor Octopus, the Rhino, the Lizard, Electro, and Black Cat. They seek to claim a fragment of the recently-shattered Cosmic Cube, only to be defeated by Spider-Man and Thor.
 The Sinister Six appear in the "Return of the Sinister Six" expansion pack for the Marvel United CMON Limited board game, consisting of Doctor Octopus, Electro, Kraven the Hunter, Mysterio, Sandman, and the Vulture.

See also
 Sinister Syndicate - A similar group of Spider-Man villains assembled by Beetle.
 Savage Six - Two similar groups of villains assembled to fight Spider-Girl and Agent Venom.

References

External links
 Sinister Six at Marvel.com
 The Sinister Twelve on Marvel Appendix
 

Marvel Comics supervillain teams
Villains in animated television series
Characters created by Stan Lee
Characters created by Steve Ditko
Spider-Man characters
Supervillains with their own comic book titles